The Surrendered Wives movement is inspired by a book, The Surrendered Wife by Laura Doyle. Its supporters suggest that women should relinquish what Doyle deems to be inappropriate control of their husbands and focus on their own happiness in order to bring romance and intimacy back to their relationship.

Philosophy 

The author of the core book of this movement maintains that she does not advocate submissiveness or the surrendering of one's self (see contradictions of this claim below); she proposes the surrendering of control over others. Indeed, in Things Will Get as Good as You Can Stand (subtitled When you learn that it is better to receive than to give– The Superwoman's Practical Guide to Getting as Much as She Gives), Doyle says women turn away praise, validation, and even help to appear to be in control.

The author writes:

The "Surrendered Wives" movement is centered on six basic principles:

 a wife relinquishes control of her husband's life
 she respects his decisions for his life
 she practices good self-care (she does at least three things a day for her own enjoyment)
 she practices expressing gratitude (thanking her husband for the things he does)
 a surrendered wife is not afraid to show her vulnerability and take the feminine approach
 she trusts him to handle household finances

Having female support is cited by Doyle as a critical component for success for the woman who chooses to surrender.

Criticism and praise 

Her critics see Doyle as advocating that women should be submissive to their husbands. Former Australian Human Rights and Equal Opportunity Commission Sex Discrimination Commissioner Pru Goward compared the movement to slavery saying "There is no such thing as an adult who can entirely subvert themselves to another person. That's called slavery and I think we abolished that several hundred years ago." She also claimed "If a man wants that sort of relationship, he actually doesn't want a relationship, he wants a doll. He wants a puppet, he wants total control and that's not the definition of a relationship."

Doyle responds that many critics appear to have little knowledge of the principles described in the book and simply react to what they imagine the book says.

Supporters argue that taken in balance, the program works for them or even saved their relationships.

Sequel

The Surrendered Single is a book to help single women attract a good man according to the principles of Surrendering. Doyle advocates the surrender of control of another. A surrendered single is a woman who chooses to apply the principles of surrendering to her life so as to serenely attract a good man rather than desperately seek a mate.

References

External links 
 Laura Doyle - Author website
 Surrendered Wife - Book website
 Surrendered Single - Book website Self-help books